Dave "Slim" Johnson was an American Negro league shortstop in the 1910s.

Johnson played for the Brooklyn Royal Giants in 1919. In his 10 recorded games, he posted five hits in 40 plate appearances.

References

External links
 and Seamheads

Year of birth missing
Year of death missing
Place of birth missing
Place of death missing
Brooklyn Royal Giants players
Baseball shortstops